Victor Lanier Harris (born March 27, 1950) is an American former professional baseball utility player. He played in Major League Baseball from 1972 through 1980 for the Texas Rangers, Chicago Cubs, St. Louis Cardinals, San Francisco Giants and Milwaukee Brewers.

Professional career

Early career 
Harris was drafted in the first round of the secondary phase of the 1970 Major League Baseball Draft by the Oakland Athletics. In July 1972 he was traded to the Texas Rangers, and made his major league debut for them the following day. He spent the rest of the season as the Rangers' regular second baseman, replacing Lenny Randle. Harris went his first 35 at-bats without a base hit, the major league record for most consecutive at-bats at the beginning of a career by a position player without a base hit.

The following season, the Rangers moved Harris to center field, replacing Joe Lovitto. In his first, and what would prove to be only, season as a regular, he batted .249 with 8 home runs and 44 runs batted in (RBI). He was traded along with Bill Madlock from the Rangers to the Chicago Cubs for Ferguson Jenkins on October 25, 1973. Called "the most valuable property in our organization" by his Rangers manager Whitey Herzog, the switch‐hitting Harris brought to the Cubs youth, speed and the versatility to play both middle infield positions plus third base and center field.

Harris started the  season back at second base, where he was the starter for most of the first half of the season. However, after hitting just .195 in 62 games, Harris season was ended midway through due to knee surgery. He was replaced by Dave Rosello and Billy Grabarkewitz. Harris spent  on the Cubs' bench, being used mostly as a pinch hitter and batting .179. That winter, he was traded to the St. Louis Cardinals for infielder Mick Kelleher.

Journeyman 
Harris spent the next three seasons with the Cardinals and then the San Francisco Giants, serving as a utilityman, playing all three outfield positions along with second base, third base, and shortstop . He was signed to a minor league contract by the Milwaukee Brewers. After a season back in the minors, Harris played in 34 games for the Brewers in 1980 to close out his major league career.

Japan 
Harris became a free agent after the 1980 season, and for 1981 he signed with the Buffaloes. That season, he batted .268 with 22 home runs and 74 RBI, all of which would have been MLB career highs. The following season, while he batted .272, his power declined, and Harris totaled just 9 home runs and 35 RBI. After another decline the following season with injuries and a .198 average, Harris's Japanese career was done. He played one final season with the Louisville Redbirds in the Cardinals' organization before retiring.

Overview 
Harris wound up playing 579 games in the majors, and was a true utilityman. He played at least 27 games at six different positions, with the largest number, 212, coming at second base.

References

External links
, or Retrosheet, or Pura Pelota

1950 births
Living people
African-American baseball players
American expatriate baseball players in Canada
American expatriate baseball players in Japan
Baseball players from California
Birmingham A's players
Burlington Bees players
Chicago Cubs players
Coos Bay-North Bend A's players
Iowa Oaks players
Kintetsu Buffaloes players
Los Angeles Valley Monarchs baseball players
Louisville Redbirds players
Major League Baseball center fielders
Major League Baseball second basemen
Milwaukee Brewers players
Phoenix Giants players
San Francisco Giants players
St. Louis Cardinals players
Texas Rangers players
Tigres de Aragua players
American expatriate baseball players in Venezuela
Vancouver Canadians players
Wichita Aeros players
21st-century African-American people
20th-century African-American sportspeople
Los Angeles High School alumni